A hypersonic glide vehicle (HGV) is a type of warhead for ballistic missiles that can maneuver and glide at hypersonic speed. It is used in conjunction with ballistic missiles to significantly change their trajectories after launch. Conventional ballistic missiles follow a predictable ballistic trajectory and are vulnerable to interception by the latest anti-ballistic missile (ABM) systems. The in-flight maneuverability of HGVs makes them unpredictable, allowing them to effectively evade air defenses. Hypersonic glide vehicles are currently the subject of an arm race.

Countermeasures 
Boost-glide weapons are generally designed to avoid existing missile defense systems, either by continually maneuvering or by flying at lower altitudes to reduce warning time. This generally makes such weapons easier to intercept using defensive systems intended for lower-altitude "low-tier" targets. Flying at lower speeds than short-range ballistic missile warheads makes them easier to attack. Those that approach with very low terminal attack profiles are even subject to attack by modern hypervelocity guns and railguns.

However, Russian sources claim that its Avangard HGV travels at Mach 27 and "constantly changes its course and altitude while it flies through the atmosphere, chaotically zigzagging on its path to its target, making it impossible to predict the weapon's location", thus making it supposedly "invulnerable to interception". However these claims are problematic as Hypersonic glide vehicles suffer from several known issues. Due to their speed, an envelope of ionized gas forms around the glide vehicle in atmosphere, making base-to-vehicle communication impossible. This cloud of ionized gas is easy for satellites to detect and track. Furthermore, the heat generated at those velocities renders external sensors inoperable and necessitates the detachment of HGVs from their carrier ballistic missiles at the upper limits of the atmosphere to avoid their burning up.  

Hypersonics, like the Avangard HGV, generally use Scramjet engines to achieve hypersonic speeds. Scramjet engines function only when the glide vehicle reaches mach 4.5. These engines are disengaged as the HGV enters the terminal phase of its flight. Failure to deactivate the engines would cause a catastrophic build up of heat in the vehicle as the atmosphere becomes denser during reentry, prematurely destroying the vehicle. Therefore, the terminal phase of an HGV's re-entry is similar to that of a Multiple independently targetable reentry vehicle. For instance, the Avangard HGV would not hit its target while "zig-zagging" at Mach 27, but rather would impact at a velocity under Mach 4 and on a linear trajectory. The superior evasion capabilities that HGVs employ are largely limited to the upper atmospheric flight span.

Existing or in development 

 Avangard (developed and deployed)

 DF-ZF (developed and deployed)

 Hypersonic Technology Vehicle 2 (experimental)
 AGM-183 Air-launched Rapid Response Weapon (ARRW) (in development)
 OpFires (in development)
 Common-Hypersonic Glide Body (C-HGB) (in development for US Army (LRHW) and US Navy Conventional Prompt Strike (CPS))

 2022 Agni V ICBM test (Suspected HGV test)
 HGV-202F  (In development)

 Hyper Velocity Gliding Projectile (HVGP) (in development)

 VMAX (in development)'''

 Hwasong-8 (in development)

See also 
 Hypersonic flight
 Hypersonic weapon
 Maneuverable reentry vehicle
 Multiple independently targetable reentry vehicle
 Non-ballistic atmospheric entry

References

Hypersonic aircraft
Ballistic missiles